Beny or Bény may refer to:

Given name 
 Beny Alagem (born 1953), Israeli-American businessman
 Beny Parnes (born 1959), Brazilian economist
 Beny Primm (1928–2015), American physician and HIV/AIDS researcher
 Beny Steinmetz (born 1956), Israeli businessman
 Beny Tchaicovsky (1954–2009), painter and musician
 Beny Wahyudi (born 1986), Indonesian footballer

Surname 
 Pierre-Yves Bény (born 1983), French gymnast
 Roloff Beny (1924–1984), Canadian photographer
 Yoewanto Setya Beny (born 1993), Indonesian footballer

Other uses 
 Bény, a commune in the Ain department in eastern France
 Bény-sur-Mer, a commune in the Calvados department in northwestern France

See also 
 Benny, given name